Ronald Hoop (born April 4, 1967 in Nieuw-Nickerie, Suriname) is a former Dutch-Surinamese football player.

Career
After starting his career with amateur side BVC in De Bilt, Utrecht, Hoop spent his career playing with several clubs throughout Europe, including a one-year spell at then Serie B side Palermo, becoming the first foreigner being signed by the rosanero in over 20 years, but failing to impress with the Sicilian side who ultimately dropped to Serie C1 that season. He then spent his later years playing with clubs in Germany and Switzerland, then choosing to quit professional football in 2004 and joining amateur club USV Elinkwijk. He retired in 2008 at the age of 41.

References

1967 births
Living people
Association football forwards
Dutch footballers
Dutch expatriate footballers
Surinamese emigrants to the Netherlands
Serie B players
Palermo F.C. players
Eredivisie players
Eerste Divisie players
FC Utrecht players
SC Telstar players
FC Dordrecht players
SV Sandhausen players
Expatriate footballers in Italy
Expatriate footballers in Germany
Dutch expatriate sportspeople in Italy
Dutch expatriate sportspeople in Germany
USV Elinkwijk players